Live in Japan is a live album by English rock and blues band 22-20s, released exclusively to Japan.

The album was recorded on 30 November 2004 at Shibuya Club Quattro, Tokyo and released on 28 March 2005.

Track listing
"Why Don’t You Do It for Me" – 3:29
"Got Messed Up" – 2:55
"Such a Fool" – 3:49
"I’m the One" – 2:47
"Hold On" – 5:02
"Shoot Your Gun" – 4:29
"Baby Brings Bad News" – 3:41
"Friends" – 3:56
"Baby You’re Not in Love" – 3:30
"Weight Off Me" – 2:18
"22 Days" – 2:59
"Cut You Down" – 2:11
"Devil in Me" – 4:44
"King Bee" – 5:19

22-20s live albums
2005 live albums
Heavenly Recordings live albums
Astralwerks live albums